Jesús Manuel Marcano Trillo (born December 25, 1950), also nicknamed "Indio", is a Venezuelan former professional baseball second baseman, who played in Major League Baseball (MLB) for the Oakland Athletics (–), Chicago Cubs (–, –), Philadelphia Phillies (–), Cleveland Indians, Montreal Expos, San Francisco Giants (–), and Cincinnati Reds. A four-time All-Star, he was the Phillies' starting second baseman when the franchise won its first-ever World Series Championship in 1980. He was known as one of the best fielding second basemen of his era, with a strong throwing arm.

Major league career

In , he was selected by the Oakland Athletics from the Phillies in the Rule 5 draft. Trillo was converted into a second baseman in  while playing for the Athletics' Triple A team, the Tucson Toros. He made his Major League debut at the age of 22 with Oakland on June 28, 1973 and stayed with the club as the Athletics won the American League Western Division pennant by six games over the Kansas City Royals.

Trillo was involved in a pair of controversies about his roster eligibility for the 1973 World Series. MLB strictly enforced a rule that only players on a major league roster on August 31 were eligible for the postseason. After José Morales' contract was sold to the Montreal Expos on September 18 and Bill North severely sprained an ankle, the A's petitioned for and received approval from the Baltimore Orioles to allow the additions of both Trillo and Allan Lewis to its roster for the American League Championship Series. A's owner Charlie Finley submitted the same request to the New York Mets, his team's Fall Classic opponent which only approved Lewis but denied Trillo his eligibility. When Mike Andrews committed two errors in a four-run twelfth inning of Oakland's Game 2 defeat, Finley attempted to have Andrews waived onto the disabled list in order to activate Trillo. Commissioner Bowie Kuhn ruled against Finley who was forced to reinstate Andrews for Game 4.

In April 1974, Trillo played 12 games for the Athletics before being sent back to the minor league Tucson Toros. He was eventually brought back to the major leagues in September. He appeared in one game of the 1974 American League Championship Series against the Baltimore Orioles, but didn't make any further appearances as the Athletics defeated the Los Angeles Dodgers in the 1974 World Series.

On October 23, Trillo was traded along with Darold Knowles and Bob Locker to the Chicago Cubs for Billy Williams. Trillo would finish third in the  National League Rookie of the Year Award balloting. With the Cubs, Trillo developed a reputation for being one of the best fielding second basemen in baseball, earning his first All-Star selection in 1977. Together with Cubs' shortstop Iván DeJesús, he formed one of the best double play combinations in baseball. He remained with the Cubs for four seasons before being traded to the Philadelphia Phillies on February 23, 1979, as part of an eight-player trade. Later that season, Trillo was reunited with his former minor league manager, Dallas Green, who had replaced Danny Ozark as the Phillies' manager.

Trillo was an integral member of the  world champion Phillies, adding solid defense, while hitting for over a .300 batting average until the middle of September, finishing the season with a career-high .292 average. He won the 1980 Silver Slugger Award for second basemen, which is awarded annually to the best offensive player at each position. In the 1980 National League Championship Series against the Houston Astros, he posted a .381 batting average with four runs batted in, and teamed up with Bake McBride in the decisive Game 5 to relay a throw to home plate, cutting off Luis Pujols attempting to score from first base on a double by Craig Reynolds. Trillo's performance earned him the League Championship Series Most Valuable Player Award.

In the 1980 World Series against the Kansas City Royals, Trillo once again made his mark in Game 5 by making another relay throw to cut off Darrell Porter trying to score in the sixth inning. He then hit a single with two outs in the ninth inning to drive home the winning run. The Phillies went on to win Game 6 and claimed the first world championship in the team's history.

1981 would be another good year for Trillo as he was selected as a reserve for the National League All-Star team, and won his second Gold Glove Award and his second consecutive Silver Slugger Award. He was voted to be the starting second baseman for the National League in the 1982 All-Star Game and set a since-broken major league record for consecutive errorless chances at second base (479), falling two games short of Joe Morgan's record 91-game errorless streak.

On December 9, 1982, Trillo was traded to the Cleveland Indians in a multi-player deal. In 1983, he made his second consecutive start as the All-Star second baseman, this time for the American League. He would spend the next six seasons with several teams, serving as a utility player before ending his career at the age of 38 with the Cincinnati Reds in 1989.

Career statistics
In a seventeen-year major league career, Trillo played in 1,780 games, accumulating 1,562 hits in 5,950 at bats for a .263 career batting average along with 61 home runs and 571 runs batted in. He ended his career with a .981 fielding percentage. A four-time All-Star, Trillo was a three-time Gold Glove winner and a two-time Silver Slugger Award winner. He led National League second basemen four times in assists, three times in range factor and twice in putouts.

In 2007, Trillo was inducted into the Venezuelan Baseball Hall of Fame and Museum.
In 1983, he was named to the Philadelphia Phillies Centennial Team as its second baseman. In 2020, he was selected for enshrinement on the Philadelphia Baseball Wall of Fame.

See also
 List of players from Venezuela in Major League Baseball
 List of Gold Glove Award winners at second base
 List of Silver Slugger Award winners at second base

References

External links

Manny Trillo at SABR (Baseball BioProject)
Manny Trillo at Baseball Almanac
Manny Trillo at Pura Pelota (Venezuelan Professional Baseball League)
 "The Cubs' New Latin Connection", by George Vass, Baseball Digest, August 1977
 "How The Phils Let Trillo Get Away", by Richie Ashburn, Baseball Digest, April 1978
 "He's Hot, But Not A Hot Dog", by Anthony Cotton, Sports Illustrated, September 8, 1980
 1980 NLCS in Sports Illustrated, October 20, 1980
 "Manny Trillo: He's Unsung But Not Under-rated!", by Jayson Stark, Baseball Digest, June 1981
 "The Game I'll Never Forget", by Manny Trillo as told to George Vass, Baseball Digest, September 1986

1950 births
Águilas del Zulia players
American League All-Stars
Birmingham A's players
Chicago Cubs players
Cincinnati Reds players
Cleveland Indians players
Gold Glove Award winners
Huron Phillies players
Iowa Oaks players
Leones del Caracas players
Living people
Llaneros de Portuguesa players
Major League Baseball players from Venezuela
Major League Baseball second basemen
Minor league baseball coaches
Minor league baseball managers
Montreal Expos players
National League All-Stars
National League Championship Series MVPs
Oakland Athletics players
People from Monagas
Philadelphia Phillies players
San Francisco Giants players
Silver Slugger Award winners
Spartanburg Phillies players
Tucson Toros players
Venezuelan baseball coaches
Venezuelan expatriate baseball players in Canada
Venezuelan expatriate baseball players in the United States